Little Acorns may refer to:

"Little Acorns", song by Arthur Kent
"Little Acorns", song by The White Stripes from Elephant 2003

See also  
Acorns (disambiguation)